Takashi Matsui (born 27 February 1940) is a Japanese ski jumper. He competed in the individual event at the 1960 Winter Olympics.

References

1940 births
Living people
Japanese male ski jumpers
Japanese male Nordic combined skiers
Olympic ski jumpers of Japan
Olympic Nordic combined skiers of Japan
Ski jumpers at the 1960 Winter Olympics
Nordic combined skiers at the 1960 Winter Olympics
Sportspeople from Hokkaido